Marvin R. Stephens (March 23, 1922 - May 22, 2008) was an American film actor. A child actor, his first Hollywood roles were in the Mickey McGuire films. Stephens then played the recurring role of Tommy McGuire in Twentieth Century Fox's Jones Family series of films.

Selected filmography
 Borrowing Trouble (1937)
 Speed to Burn (1938)
 Love on a Budget (1938)
 Down on the Farm (1938)
 Safety in Numbers (1938)
 A Trip to Paris (1938)
 Quick Millions (1939)
 Fighting Thoroughbreds (1939)
 Everybody's Baby (1939)
 Young as You Feel (1940)
 Ride, Kelly, Ride (1941)
 Freckles Comes Home (1942)

References

Bibliography
 Dwyer, Ruth. Malcolm St. Clair: His Films, 1915-1948. Scarecrow Press, 1996.

External links

1922 births
2008 deaths
American male film actors
20th-century American male actors
People from Grants, New Mexico
American male child actors